Fighter kites are kites used for the sport of kite fighting. Traditionally most are small, unstable single-line flat kites where line tension alone is used for control, at least part of which is manja, typically glass-coated cotton strands, to cut down the line of others.

Kite fighting is contested in many countries, but particularly in Afghanistan, Bangladesh, India, Indonesia, Nepal, Pakistan, Vietnam, Korea, Thailand, Chile and Brazil.

Materials 
In most traditional fighter kite manufacture, the skins of kites are made from a lightweight thin paper and the spars are usually made from a lightweight and flexible wood, usually bamboo.

In modern American fighters, the kite skins are made from a variety of synthetic materials – mylar, aircraft insulation (orcon or insulfab), nylon, and polyester sheeting. The spine may still be bamboo, but often along with the bow is constructed of fiberglass or carbon fibre.

Line 
Historically, for most Asian type fighters, a thin cotton or hemp line is coated with a mixture of finely crushed glass and rice glue. In recent years, synthetic line has been coated with a variety of abrasives and stronger glue. Also, there have been some reports of metallic line being used. Some cultures use line that has metal knives attached to hook and cut the opponent's line.

Traditionally, players use a paste of some sort to toughen their line. The primary components of this include glue and crushed glass, but depending on personal preference other materials are added to improve the properties of the line.

In line touch competition, synthetic braided fishing line, 15 to 20 lb test, is used due to its low stretch and high strength for the line diameter and weight. Waxed cotton, linen line or Latex can also be used.

Key equipment names 

 Spectra – A brand of fishing line used for American kite fighting.
 Power Pro – A very thin [0.25 mm diameter] braided fishing line used for American kite fighting.
 Hilo de competencia (o Hilo Curado) – The cutting line used in Chile.
 Cerol – The cutting line /thread used in Brazil
In Afghanistan:
 Tar – cutting line
In South Asia:
 Manjha – cutting line of India, Bangladesh and Pakistan (but manjho in Rajasthan).
In and around greater Punjab:
 Dore – cutting line.
 Pench – fighting to cut a kite down.
 Kai Po Chhe –  the winner says this to proclaim victory.
Elsewhere in Asia
 Gelasan – The cutting line thread used in Indonesia

Bridle and tuning 
Bridle position, spine curve, centre of gravity, and balance of tension on the spars all play a role in how the kite spins and tracks. Afghan and Indian fighter kites and their variants have their bridles attached in two places on the kite's spine. The first place is at the crossing of the bow and the spine. The second attachment is three-quarters to two-thirds of the total length of the spine from the nose of the kite. The length of the top line to the tow point is the length between the two bridle to spine connection points. The length of the bottom bridle to the tow point is between half an inch to two inches (1.2–5 cm) longer than the length of the two spine connections. The spine of the kite has a slight convex curve toward the face of the kite. To make the kite spin more, the upper bridle line is shortened: to make the kite spin less, the lower bridle line is shortened . Left and right tracking are adjusted by either placing weight on the tip of a wing, or by weakening the bow on the side that you want the kite to track towards. The design of the kite plays a role in the tendency for the kite to spin and pull, and how much wind the kite can handle. Bridling and tuning are only effective when the kite chosen is able to handle the amount of wind that it is being flown in. If the wind is so strong that the spine and bow are severely distorted, no amount of bridle tuning will help with making the kite controllable. A crude method of making a kite flyable in over-strong wind, used in India where the kites are cheap and regarded as disposable, is to burn small holes in the flying surface, typically using a cigarette.

Kite fighting 

When the kite is flown with the line taut, the kite is deformed by the wind pressure, giving it a degree of stability. When the line tension is reduced, either by letting out more line or by the flyer moving into wind, the kite will begin to become unstable and begin to rock from side to side, or in extreme cases even spin. By reapplying tension at the right moment, the kite will move in the direction that the flyer requires.

Although a spool that allows rapid winding and release of line is used, often the flyer will fly the kite by holding the line instead of the spool, with one or more assistants to help manage the slack line between the flyer and the spool.

Line cutting contests 
Many of these kites are flown with a typically very sharp, abrasive coated line (manja). Most are flown with a set length of this at the kite end. To avoid getting hand injuries ordinary string (saddi) is used for the ground end. Some lines have thin blades attached to the tail, line, or kite. Competition rules vary by region. Two or more contestants fly their kites. The person who cuts the opponent's line wins the fight. In multiple kite matches, the person with the last kite in the air is the winner.

The two most common types of cutting are done with abrasive coated line – release cutting or pull cutting. To release cut, once lines are in contact, both parties reel out their lines until one is cut. In pull cutting, the flier quickly pulls in the line. Winning factors include the skill of the kite flyer, size of the kite, its speed, agility and durability, the quality of the line, its sharpness, the quality and size of the spool, the spool mechanism, initial contact and wind conditions.

Most contests are informal neighbourhood affairs.  Organised competitions do exist, such as since 2015 the "Red Bull Kite Fight" each year in a series of cities in North India.

Capture or grounding competition 
Two or more kites are flown. Competitors try to capture their opponents kite and bring it to the ground. The person or team who succeeds is the winner. Expert kite fighters are able to cut their opponent's line (manjha) and then encircle the trailing line (lubjow) of the cut kite. Once secured, the winner can then fly both kites and pull in the prize. If the cut kite is not captured, then the kite belongs to no-one, and "kite runners" - typically younger children - will attempt to pursue and claim it.

By country 
The various countries where fighter kites are flown all have their own specific styles of kites, rules for fighting and traditions. In many cases there is a "season" or a special occasion particularly associated with kite flying.

Nepal 
"changa chait" is the kite fighting game enjoyed by Nepalese. It is most commonly seen on the sky on Nepal near to dashain and tihar festival (September , October) it is quite popular leisure activity during the festival as people get short vacation due to festival.

Afghanistan 
Kites used range from 0.5-meter to 1.5 meters across. The usual name for the sport is gudiparan bazi and for the cutting line tar. As elsewhere, the line is traditionally made with a cotton line and coated with a mixture of crushed glass and rice glue. However, nylon string with stronger glue is now often the preferred line. Kites can go up to 3,500 meters in height depending on the size of the kite.

From 1996 to 2001, the Taliban government in Afghanistan outlawed kite fighting, and kite flying, by declaring it "un-Islamic". After the fall of the Taliban government kite fighting has returned to the country.

Bangladesh 

As part of the Shakrain festival, people mostly from south Dhaka city engage in kite fighting. They fly kites mostly from the rooftops. The festival is held in the last day of the Poush month.

Brazil 
In Brazil, kite fighting is a very popular leisure activity for children, teenagers and even young adults, particularly boys and men. As in other countries with similar traditions, injuries are common and motorcyclists in particular need to take precautions. The traditional kite (or "pipa"), has pentagonal shape, but simple diamonds similar to fighter kites elsewhere are also very common.

Caribbean 
Most Caribbean kites are hexagonal, flown with a tail, and instead of cutting with glass-coated line, use sharp objects (generally razor blades) attached to the tails to try to "koule" (Creole for "drop") other kites.

Instances have been media-covered or promoted in Haiti, Cuba, Trinidad and Tobago, Curaçao and Suriname.

Chile 
They are roughly square, and made with light paper and bamboo sticks. Unlike other square fighter kites of the world, the Chilean volantín uses 3 support threads (two at the top and one at the bottom) for easier, more stable manoeuvre. Used for decoration or to highlight a celebratory motif such as the national flag, a trailing tail is left out for competitive matches. The Chilean volantín ranges from ñecla, the smallest size available, to pavo, the largest. However, for fighting medio pavo, those of mid-size are most popular due to their more balanced performance in terms of speed, strength, and accuracy.
Practitioners of this activity usually begin fighting in September, when the spring winds buffet the coast. Clubs and professional associations prefer to host tournaments throughout the drier summer months when the commercial kite season is over.

Chilean kite fighting practice include the use of a large reel, (carrete), for the manipulation and storage of the abrasive thread, and the use of wooden sticks for the manipulation of the carrete in turn. Thus a skilled kite fighter will likely complete a match without ever touching the thread with their hands, having mastered these rods. Since the mid 2000s, they have spread across Latin America and Europe. Their convenience, durability and safety results in equipment exports and tourism.

India 

Fighter kites are known as patang in india. In many others, kite flying takes place mainly during specific festivals particularly the spring festival known as Basant, during Makar Sankranti and more recently on Indian Independence Day.

Japan 
The Nagasaki Hata is similar to the Indian Patang, and it believed to have been introduced into Japan, from Indonesia, by Dutch traders. It is highly manoeuvrable and fought with glass coated line in line cutting contests in a similar way to kite fighting in many other countries.

A quite different type of kite fighting in Japan uses very large kites requiring teams. In these contests cutting line is not used, but instead kites are forced down. The festivals occur at Shirone and Hamamatsu. The Rokkaku is a smaller 1-2m high hexagonal kite, but also fought with teams of players flying each kite. Both the Rokkaku and the smaller rectangular Buka have been adopted and further developed by western kite enthusiasts.

Korea 
The bang-pae yeon is a rectangular, bowed "shield" kite with a hole in the middle of the sail. The frame uses five bamboo spars—one each across the top and the "waist" of the kite, a "spine," and two diagonals.

Although cutting line and fights are similar to other Asian fighter kites, a large spool is always used.

Nepal 
Kite fighting in Nepal is especially active during the festival of Dashain. The skies are filled with colourful kites called changas, made from Nepali lokta paper. The line used is coated in crushed glass to cut through the lines of rival kites. When a rival line has been cut, the victorious team shouts "chet" to claim their win over the other team.

Pakistan 
Kite fighting is common in all over Pakistan, but mainly concentrated in cities of Punjab and Sindh region including Lahore, Faisalabad, Gujranwala, Karachi, Islamabad etc. While city of Lahore is considered as the capital of kite battling in South Asia. Kite flying is considered as the culture of Lahore. In the past, kite battling had a status of sports in Lahore, and those kite flyers were termed as "Khilari" or sportsman.

The kites that are manufactured for battling are very different from the conventional kites as they are especially designed and made for this purpose. Each of these kites has some special abilities for battling which make them unique from each other. According to history, Akbar the Mughal Emperor, who lived in his residence in Lahore from 1584 to 1598, enclosed the city with brick walls and 12 gates of considerable height and strength. One of the gates, called the "Moochi Darwaza" or "Cobbler Gateway," is the most popular site in Lahore to buy and sell Kite flying and firework materials. Kup, Patang, Guda, Nakhlaoo, Pan, Tukal, Muchal, Farfarata, etc. are some of the kites used in the battle, and they vary in balance, weight and speed through the air.

Kite flying is currently banned in some regions of Pakistan as some kite fliers engage in kite battles by coating their strings with glass or shards of metal, leading to injuries and death.

Threads for kite battling are manufactured using special glues, chemicals and crushed glass and are numbered based on their ability to cut other threads and to handle kite's weight. It is a social event in Pakistan that happens once a year.

Bassant in Lahore 
City of Lahore is famous for its Bassant or Spring Festival throughout South Asian communities. People from all over Pakistan and many from neighbouring India come to Lahore to annually celebrate the two days long Bassant or Spring Festival. This festival is mostly held on last weekend of February or March. Festival is started on the night of Saturday, people battle White coloured kites, organise parties and arrange loud music on their rooftops throughout the night till morning. Whitepaper kite shimmer in the night sky diving soaring as rival flyers joust duels marked with the battle cries of "paich" (When kite flyers entangle the manja of their flying kites with each other and try to cut the string of the other by the pull or release method) and victory cries of "wo kaataa". Every success is celebrated with Bhangra Dance and beating of traditional drum.

United States 
The Korean shield kite (pangp'aeyon), the Japanese Rokkaku and Nagasaki Hata, the Brazilian Piao, the Chilean fighter kites have been used for demonstration purposes at various large kite festivals throughout the country. Kite fighting is also regional to each state, many kites differ from state to state. Kite fighters in the Pacific Northwest prefer smaller more maneuverable kites popularized by names such as Bruce Lambert. NAFKA, also known as North American Kite Fighting Association has had a few gatherings in the past few years in Washington and Oregon. In Southern California, many different kites are flown. The San Diego kite club has facilitated a  New Year’s Day kite fight every year for the past 30 or so years. Many big names such as Victor Heredia have attended such competition and offered prizes just for beating him. He is a living legend among kite fighters on the west coast. As far as the east coast many different cultures have influenced immigrants, who like to share such treasures and traditions.  Kite fights are scheduled with many different kite clubs for traditional as well as “line-touch” fights. The vast majority of all kite fights in the western region of the United States are one-on-one battles.

Fighter kite competitors in the United States use a variety of innovative kites from a wide range of designs and materials for "line touch" and skills competitions. Fighter or "single line maneuverable" kites can be found flying throughout the country at many kite festivals.  A championship competition occurs at the annual convention of the American Kitefliers Association.

Problems

Accidents 
In India, Pakistan, Brazil and Chile, there have been reported accidents  involving the abrasive coated cutting line. These accidents range in severity from small cuts on the fighter's fingers to a few reported deaths from contact with the line while riding motorcycles. In recent years, the fighting lines have evolved from the traditional cotton, rice and glass line to nylon or synthetic line coated with metallic or chemical abrasive compounds. To prevent further injury, many countries have implemented restrictions or bans on the use of cutting line. Some have set limits on the materials used to make the line, others have mandated safety devices on motorcycles when riding during kite festivals. People have been injured while fixated on capturing a cut kite. Other injuries have been due to not paying attention to one's actions while watching battles. Most of these accidents are preventable when fighting is strictly controlled to a specific arena and proper safety gear is worn by the fighters. Other accidents have occurred due to the masses of people present during large kite festivals for which kite fighting has taken the blame.

Environmental difficulties 
The kite strings left around after the fight can become stuck in tall trees and can stay there for long periods, impacting the natural aesthetic of parks and wilderness areas, thus degrading the experience of other park users from the trash that is left about.

The sharpened kite strings are a particular hazard for flying birds, as the strings easily cut through muscle and bone. Even with proper medical care, the birds take many weeks to recover. Stray animals have also been known to get trapped and injured on kite lines that have fallen closer to the ground.

Types of kite 
 Benang Gelasan (Indonesia Fighter's Kite Threads) "Kelud"> Hary Wibi Product Kediri
 Layangan Aduan (rest of Indonesia)
 Layangan Palembang(Palembang – Indonesia)
 Lokta Changa (Nepal)
 Indian Fighter Kite (India) (also known as a Patang)
 Pakistani Fighter Kite (Pakistan) (also known as a Patang)
 Tukkal (Pakistan and India)
 Do Pana (Pakistan)
 Gum Pana (Pakistan)
 Shistru (Pakistan)
 Teera (Pakistan)
 Kupp (Pakistan)
 Salara (Pakistan)
 Kashti (Pakistan)
 Suit (Pakistan)
 Gulair (Pakistan)
 Do Akkhal (Pakistan)
 Piyala (Pakistan)
 Macchar (Pakistan)
 Farfarata (Pakistan)
 Hata (Japan)
 Rokkaku (Japan)
 Afghan Fighter Kite (Afghanistan)
 Shield Kite (Korea)
 Chula and Pakpao (Thailand)
 American Fighter Kite ((United States and Canada))
 Pipas (Brazil)
 Volantines (Chile)

See also 
 Kite running, the practice of running after and catching kites drifting in the sky which have been cut loose in battle with other kites.
 Manja or Manjha, Hindi/Urdu for the abrasive coated fighting line as used in Pakistan and India.
 Basant Panchami, Spring festival of Hindus celebrated with kite-flying in India.
 Shakrain, Bengali kite festival
 Uttarayan, The kite flying festival of northern India.
 The novel The Kite Runner, and the movie based on it.

References

External links 

 Cyber Fighter Website
 Fighter Kite Central
 The North American Fighter Kite Association
 Pakistan tackles killer kites
 Indian Fighter Kite Designs
 Kite Heritage – Indian Kite Collection
 Kite India – Origin, History, Definition
 Kite Flyers India Official Website
 India's Largest Bamboo Fighter Kite World Record 2014
 American Kitefliers Association

Kites
Kite flying
Sport in Afghanistan
Traditional sports of India
Sport in Korea
Sport in Nepal
Traditional sports of Pakistan
Indian games
Pakistani games
Korean games
Traditional sports of Bangladesh
Bangladeshi games